Spain participated in the Eurovision Song Contest 2009 with the song "La noche es para mí" written by Irini Michas, Dimitri Stassos, Jason Gill and Felipe Pedroso. The song was performed by Soraya. The Spanish broadcaster Televisión Española (TVE) organised the national final Eurovisión 2009: El retorno in order to select the Spanish entry for the 2009 contest in Moscow, Russia. The national final consisted of three semi-finals and a final and involved 30 artists and songs. Ten entries ultimately qualified to compete in the televised final where an in-studio jury and a public televote selected "La noche es para mí" performed by Soraya as the winner.

As a member of the "Big Four", Spain automatically qualified to compete in the final of the Eurovision Song Contest. Performing as the closing entry during the show in position 25, Spain placed twenty-fourth out of the 25 participating countries with 23 points.

Background 

Prior to the 2009 contest, Spain had participated in the Eurovision Song Contest forty-eight times since its first entry in 1961. The nation has won the contest on two occasions: in 1968 with the song "La, la, la" performed by Massiel and in 1969 with the song "Vivo cantando" performed by Salomé, the latter having won in a four-way tie with France, the Netherlands and the United Kingdom. Spain has also finished second four times, with Karina in 1971, Mocedades in 1973, Betty Missiego in 1979 and Anabel Conde in 1995. In 2008, Spain placed sixteenth with the song "Baila el Chiki Chiki" performed by Rodolfo Chikilicuatre.

The Spanish national broadcaster, Televisión Española (TVE), broadcasts the event within Spain and organises the selection process for the nation's entry. TVE confirmed their intentions to participate at the 2009 Eurovision Song Contest on 21 November 2008. In 2007 and 2008, TVE organised a national final featuring a competition among several artists and songs to select both the artist and song that would represent Spain, a procedure which was continued for their 2009 entry.

Before Eurovision

Eurovisión 2009: El retorno 
Eurovisión 2009: El retorno was the national final organised by TVE that took place at the Casino l'Aliança del Poblenou Theatre in Barcelona, hosted by Alaska and Miguel Serrano. The national final consisted of four shows which commenced on 14 February 2009 and concluded with a winning song and artist during the final on 28 February 2009. All shows were broadcast on La 1, TVE Internacional as well as online via TVE's official website rtve.es.

Format 
Thirty artists and songs, selected through an Internet round, competed in Eurovisión 2009: El retorno which consisted of four shows: three semi-finals on 14, 21 and 28 February 2009, and the final also on 28 February 2009. Each semi-final featured ten entries and four qualified for the final. The twelve qualifying entries competed in the final during which the winning entry was determined. The initial format of the national final was to include a Second Chance round which would feature the fourth-placed songs of each semi-final, however the show was later removed due to low ratings of the first two semi-finals and for the purpose of aiding the winning artist in preparing their performance, choreography and official preview video for the Eurovision Song Contest. The results during all four shows were decided upon through a combination of public televoting (50%) and an in-studio expert jury (50%). Four members of the jury were appointed by TVE, while an additional member was selected during the first semi-final through the same voting process. The votes of the expert jury and the public televote each created an overall ranking from which points from 1-8, 10 and 12 were distributed.

The five members of the in-studio jury that evaluated the entries during the shows were:

 José Luis Uribarri – Television presenter and director, commentator of the Eurovision Song Contest for Spain
 Mauro Canut – Musician, editor and deputy director at the digital branch of TVE
 Mariola Orellana – Music producer
 Toni Garrido – Journalist at RNE
Víctor Escudero – Author

Competing entries 
A submission period was open from 24 November 2008 until 17 December 2008 for artists to upload their entries through the Eurovisión 2009: El retorno MySpace platform. At the conclusion of the submission period, 978 entries were received, of which 455 were selected for an Internet vote. The selected entries were allocated to ten categories by genre and revealed via TVE's official website on 19 December 2008. The ten categories and the number of songs competing were:

 Pop/Rock - 188
 Ballad - 37
 Metal - 12
 Electronic - 63
 Latin - 29
 Hip Hop - 9
 Indie - 18
 Flamenco - 10
 R&B - 19
 Other - 45

Users had until 19 January 2009 to distribute twenty votes for their five favourite entries per day and the top twenty entries among the top five entries of each category directly qualified for the national final, which were announced on 20 January 2009. The remaining thirty entries were performed in front of the four in-studio jury members appointed by TVE on 31 January 2009 during a live webcast audition at the Casino l'Aliança del Poblenou Theatre in Barcelona, broadcast on TVE's official website, where an additional ten entries were selected for the national final. Prior to the audition, "Gitana – “Ya layla”" performed by Sin Tanto and "Un día sin fuste" performed by Depresión Post-Parto were withdrawn and replaced with the songs "La presumida" performed by Antonio Moreno Bermúdez and "Yo solo" performed by José Antonio Santiago Beltrán, respectively.

Fifth jury selection 
The selection of the fifth in-studio jury member took place over two stages. In the first stage, twenty of the 26 applicants were revealed via TVE's official website on 19 December 2008 and users had until 19 January 2009 to vote for their favourite candidates. The top five candidates qualified for the second stage which took place during the first semi-final on 14 February 2009, where the fifth jury member, Víctor Escudero, was selected following the combination of votes of the four in-studio jury members appointed by TVE (50%) and a public televote (50%).

Shows

Semi-final 1
The first semi-final took place on 14 February 2009. "Amante de la luna" performed by Melody y Los Vivancos, "Dame un beso" performed by La La Love You, "Cruza los dedos" performed by Noelia Cano and "Despedida de soltero" performed by Gran Baobab qualified for the final through the combination of votes of an in-studio jury (50%) and a public televote (50%). In addition to the performances of the competing entries, guest performers included Tequila and Fangoria.

Following the first semi-final, Los Vivancos announced that they would be withdrawing from the national final due to the lack of technical and artistic resources in the production of the show as well as that their bid was being promoted as Melody even though it was a joint bid. Melody later announced that she would remain in the final and would perform with other dancers.

Semi-final 2
The second semi-final took place on 21 February 2009. "La noche es para mí" performed by Soraya, "True Love" performed by Virginia, "Si yo vengo a enamorarte" performed by Jorge González and "Lujuria" performed by Salva Ortega qualified for the final through the combination of votes of an in-studio jury (50%) and a public televote (50%). In addition to the performances of the competing entries, guest performers included Rosario Flores and Nena Daconte.

Semi-final 3
The third semi-final took place on 28 February 2009. "Samba House" performed by Santa Fe, "Nada es comparable a ti" performed by Mirela, "Ahora no" performed by Isi and "Ya no estás" performed by Julia Bermejo qualified for the final through the combination of votes of an in-studio jury (50%) and a public televote (50%).

Final 
The final took place on 28 February 2009 following the third semi-final. The twelve entries that qualified from the preceding three semi-finals competed and the winner, "La noche es para mí" performed by Soraya, was selected through the combination of votes of an in-studio jury (50%) and a public televote (50%). Melody and Soraya were tied at 22 points each but since Soraya received the most votes from the public she was declared the winner. In addition to the performances of the competing entries, guest performers included Carlos Baute, Chipper and Nancys Rubias.

Ratings

Promotion 
Soraya made several appearances across Europe to specifically promote "La noche es para mí" as the Spanish Eurovision entry. On 18 and 19 April, Soraya took part in promotional activities in Belgium and performed at the Place Sainte Catherine venue in Brussels. On 18 April, she performed during Eurovision Promo Concert event which was held at the Amsterdam Marcanti venue in Netherlands and hosted by Marga Bult and Maggie MacNeal. On 27 and 28 April, she took part in promotional activities in Portugal where she performed "La noche es para mí" on the RTP1 talk show Portugal no coração and appeared during the programmes Música do Mondo and Só visto!. On 29 April, Soraya performed during a special concert, which was held at the Golden Hits venue in Stockholm. In addition to her international appearances, she performed during a Spanish Eurovision party, which took place at the La Boite club in Madrid on 3 April.

At Eurovision
According to Eurovision rules, all nations with the exceptions of the host country and the "Big Four" (France, Germany, Spain and the United Kingdom) are required to qualify from one of two semi-finals in order to compete for the final; the top ten countries from each semi-final progress to the final. As a member of the "Big 4", Spain automatically qualified to compete in the final on 16 May 2009. In addition to their participation in the final, Spain is also required to broadcast and vote in one of the two semi-finals. The EBU's Reference Group approved a request by the Spanish broadcaster for Spain to broadcast the second semi-final on 14 May 2009 due to its commitments to broadcast the Madrid Open tennis tournament.

In Spain, the second semi-final was broadcast on a tape delay on La 2 and the final was broadcast on La 1 with commentary by Joaquín Guzmán. The Spanish spokesperson, who announced the Spanish votes during the final, was Iñaki del Moral. The broadcast of the final was watched by 5.12 million viewers in Spain with a market share of 35.9%. This represented a decrease of 23.4% from the previous year with 4.214 million less viewers.

Final 
Soraya took part in technical rehearsals on 9 and 10 May, followed by dress rehearsals on 15 and 16 May. This included the jury final on 15 May where the professional juries of each country watched and voted on the competing entries. During the running order draw for the semi-final and final on 16 March 2009, Spain chose to perform last in position 25 in the final as one of the seven wildcard countries, following the entry from Finland.

The Spanish performance featured Soraya on stage wearing a purple jumpsuit with crystal inlays, joined by three backing vocalists wearing purple dresses and two dancers wearing black suits. The performance began with the performers on a small staircase which they made use of throughout the performance. The LED screens displayed nightclub-styled imagery including disco balls, projections of the lyrics from the song "Take me!" and "Shake me!", and a close-up of Soraya's face. The performance also featured pyrotechnic flame effects as well as the use of glitter fountains and red bolts. The choreographer for the performance was Mayte Marcos. The three backing vocalists that joined Barei were Noemí Gallego, Verónica Ferreiro and Nora Gallego, while the two dancers were Dima Oleschenko and Alexey Postolovski. Spain placed twenty-fourth in the final, scoring 23 points.

Voting 
Voting during the three shows consisted of 50 percent public televoting and 50 percent from a jury deliberation. The jury consisted of five music industry professionals who were citizens of the country they represent. This jury was asked to judge each contestant based on: vocal capacity; the stage performance; the song's composition and originality; and the overall impression by the act. In addition, no member of a national jury could be related in any way to any of the competing acts in such a way that they cannot vote impartially and independently. In the second semi-final, Spain's vote was based on 100 percent jury voting due to the delayed broadcast.

Following the release of the full split voting by the EBU after the conclusion of the competition, it was revealed that Spain had placed twenty-first with the public televote and twenty-fifth (last) with the jury vote. In the public vote, Spain scored 38 points and in the jury vote the nation scored 9 points.

Below is a breakdown of points awarded to Spain and awarded by Spain in the first semi-final and grand final of the contest. The nation awarded its 12 points to Norway in the semi-final and the final of the contest.

Points awarded to Spain

Points awarded by Spain

Detailed voting results
The following members comprised the Spanish jury:

 José Luis Uribarri – commentator
 Toni Garrido – journalist at RNE
 Mauro Canut – musician, editor and deputy director at the digital branch of TVE
 Mariola Orellana – music producer
 Pedro Martínez – composer

Notes and references

Notes 

 a. Santa Fe's song competed as "You got me hot" in the online vote, but was retitled "Samba House" for the semi-finals.
 b. Each member of the jury gave points in the traditional Eurovision style of 12, 10, 8-1 point(s), and when these points were added, both La Red de San Luis and Noelia Cano had 35 points. Later, when these points where translated depending on the ranking in order to be added to the televotes, the tie between La Red de San Luis and Noelia Cano was broken, but it was not announced how.
 c. Due to technical difficulties in the performance, Melody y Los Vivancos was allowed to restart their performance.

References 

2009
Countries in the Eurovision Song Contest 2009
Eurovision
Eurovision